Pierre Olivier Sarközy de Nagy-Bocsa (born May 26, 1969) is a French banker based in the United States.  His half-brother is Nicolas Sarkozy, the former President of France.

Early life
Sarkozy was born to Pal Sarkozy de Nagy-Bocsa, a nobleman of Hungarian descent, and Christine de Ganay, who was herself of French descent. His father was previously married and had three children with his first wife, including Nicolas, whom Sarkozy met weekly during his early childhood. De Ganay divorced Pal Sarkozy, and then married  an American diplomat, when Sarkozy was 7. He spent the rest of his childhood and adolescence outside France, living in Zambia, Egypt, and a boarding school in the UK. Sarkozy later studied at the University of St Andrews, where he earned an M.A. in medieval history.

Career
In 1990, Sarkozy was hired by American investment bank Dillon, Read & Co. He left three years later to join Credit Suisse First Boston, where he held several senior posts, including Managing Director in the Financial Institutions Group.

While at CSFB, Sarkozy advised Wachovia in its merger of equals with First Union and concurrent defense against a competing hostile proposal from Suntrust; Dime Bancorp in its merger with Washington Mutual; CoreStates Financial in its sale to First Union; and Wells Fargo in its merger with Norwest Corporation and acquisition of First Interstate, among others.

In January 2003, he joined UBS Investment Bank, where he was Global Co-Head of the Financial Institutions Group. At UBS, he worked on such transactions as Sallie Mae's attempt to go private and subsequent recapitalization; ABN Amro's  $21 billion sale of LaSalle Bank to Bank of America; Mellon's $17 billion merger of equals with the Bank of New York; Charles Schwab's sale of U.S. Trust to Bank of America; MBNA's $36 billion sale to Bank of America; Wachovia's $14 billion acquisition of Southtrust; National Commerce's $7 billion sale to Suntrust; and Regions Financial's $6 billion merger of equals with Union Planters. 

Sarkozy was responsible for CIBC's $2.9 billion recapitalization and Sallie Mae's $3.0 billion recapitalization. He also acted as lead advisor in a number of other notable transactions, including Dime Bancorp's private placement of preferred and other equity securities to Warburg Pincus (as part of its successful defense against a hostile tender offer from North Fork) and the recapitalization of Glendale Federal Bank, representing the then-largest recapitalization in history. On March 3, 2008, he was appointed Co-head and Managing Director of the Carlyle Group's Global Financial Services Group. He resigned from that position in May 2016. Based in New York City, Sarkozy is a member of the Board of Directors of BankUnited.

Personal life
In the 1990s, Sarkozy married Charlotte Bernard, a freelance fashion writer and author of children's books, who grew up in Paris. They were married by his half-brother, Nicolas, who was then mayor of Neuilly-sur-Seine. They have two children named Margot and Julien. Sarkozy and Bernard were married for 14 years before separating in 2010, with their divorce being finalized the following year.

In May 2012, Sarkozy began a relationship with fashion designer and former child actress Mary-Kate Olsen. The two were married on November 27, 2015, at a private residence in New York City. On April 17, 2020, Olsen filed for divorce from Sarkozy. On May 13, she filed an emergency order to proceed despite delays due to the COVID-19 pandemic, but it was denied a day later. On January 25, 2021, the divorce was finalized.

References

Living people
Alumni of the University of St Andrews
Businesspeople from Paris
The Carlyle Group people
French emigrants to the United States
French people of Hungarian descent
Hungarian nobility
Place of birth missing (living people)
UBS people
Olivier
1969 births